Refuge is an EP by the German heavy metal band Rage, released in 1994. This EP contains the song "Refuge" and covers of the bands The Police, The Troggs and The Mission.

Track listing

Personnel

Band members
Peter "Peavy" Wagner - vocals, bass, arrangements
Manni Schmidt - guitars
Chris Ephthimiadis - drums

Rage (German band) albums
1994 EPs
Noise Records EPs
Speed metal EPs